Richard Merrill Cohen (born February 14, 1948) is an American journalist, television producer, and author. He is a former senior producer for CBS News and CNN.

Career
Cohen is the recipient of several honors in journalism. He is a three-time Emmy award-winning CBS News journalist.

He is a former senior producer for CBS News and CNN, and he occasionally writes columns for the "Health and Fitness" section of The New York Times.

Biography
Cohen is the son of Teresa (Beitzer) and Benjamin Cohen, a doctor. He has had multiple sclerosis since he was 25 years old. He has also had two bouts of colon cancer, one in 1999 and one in 2000.

Cohen, who is legally blind, has written an autobiography titled, Blindsided: Lifting a Life Above Illness: A Reluctant Memoir.

Cohen married television personality Meredith Vieira (NBC News Special Correspondent and former co-anchor of NBC's Today Show) on June 14, 1986. They live in Irvington, Westchester County, New York and have three children. Their middle child, Gabe Cohen, was a reporter at KHQ-TV in Spokane, Washington and is now a reporter at KOMO-TV in Seattle, Washington.

References

Published works

External links

1948 births
Living people
People with multiple sclerosis
American television journalists
Emmy Award winners
American television news producers
Peabody Award winners
Writers from Connecticut
21st-century American non-fiction writers
American memoirists
American male journalists
20th-century American journalists
21st-century American male writers